Route 52 is an east/west highway running from its eastern terminus at Route 133  east of St. Elizabeth to the Kansas state line where it continues as K-52 (this road continues for 23 additional miles).  Highway 52 comprises  of primarily two-lane roadway in Missouri. 

Route 52 was formerly Route 24 between Eldon and the Kansas state line.  The numbering change was to avoid duplication with the new U.S. Route 24 which came through Missouri in 1926.

Route description
Route 52 begins at the Kansas state line from a continuation from K-52. It shares a brief concurrency with I-49. After leaving I-49 it passes through Deepwater then it shares a concurrency with Route 13. It passes through Clinton where it leaves Route 13. Route 52 intersects with Route 2 in Windsor. Route 52 shares a concurrency with US 65. After leaving US 65, Route 52 passes through Cole Camp, Stover, and Versailles where it has a concurrency with Route 5. It leaves Route 5 and then passes through Marvin, Barnett, and Eldon before crossing US 54. It passes through Tuscumbia then it crosses the Osage River with a concurrency with Route 17. After leaving Route 17, it passes through St. Elizabeth then it ends at Route 133.

History

Major intersections

References

052
Transportation in Bates County, Missouri
Transportation in Henry County, Missouri
Transportation in Pettis County, Missouri
Transportation in Benton County, Missouri
Transportation in Morgan County, Missouri
Transportation in Miller County, Missouri
Transportation in Maries County, Missouri